The New Concept of War Fighting (NCWF) is a military doctrine of the Pakistani armed forces coordinated by the army and air force with additional contribution by the navy. It is based on the Cold Star military doctrine of the Indian Army with uncertain additional concepts, tactics, and practices implemented by the Pakistan army. It was created after the Indian military created CSD doctrine. Likewise, the Indian doctrine, NCWF, is designed to carry out the operations, mobilization of troops and improving inter-services coordination in Indo–Pakistan related conflicts, the two countries that share the same military culture, tradition, and history based on the British India Army.

It was formerly adopted in 2013 with a central role by the National Defence University and air force. Established after Pakistan armed forces conducted a series of military exercises, including Azm-e-Nau and Azm-e-Naumilitary, its principal goals are focused on conducting independent secret missions in India-Pakistan conflicts with equipment distributions by the navy, airforce and the army, including Babur cruise missiles, submarines, fast attack crafts, missile boats, and Harbah, an anti-ship missile.

Origin 
The NCWF is named after Pakistani army's military exercises conducted between 2009 and 2013. Its principles of war are to making defensive operations and offensive marching such as moving faster and air supremacy, among others, against the opposing military and before the opposing army do so.

See also 
 Nuclear doctrine of Pakistan

References 

Military doctrines of Pakistan
India–Pakistan military relations
Policies of Pakistan